Espy Sans is a bitmap font designed by Garrett Boge and Damon Clark of LetterPerfect Fonts for the Apple Computer user interface group in 1992. The Espy family, consisting of Sans & Serif, Regular & Bold in discrete bitmap sizes of 8, 9, 10, 12 & 14 pt, replaced Apple's previous use of Chicago and Geneva in Mac OS 7.5 released in 1995. It was also used for the Newton PDA project and their eWorld online bulletin board service. It was later adapted for use in the Apple Guide help system and some versions of the iPod, particularly the iPod mini. Before the release of the Charcoal font used for Mac OS 8 and 9, it was a popular replacement system font for reskinnings of Mac OS 7.x, being included in system extensions such as Greg Landweber's Aaron extension.

See also
Apple typography

External links
 Using the Espy Font at LowEndMac.com
 Macintosh System Fonts at LowEndMac.com
 Web Browsing with Espy at LowEndMac.com

Apple Inc. typefaces
Sans-serif typefaces